Drawyer Creek is a  long tributary to the Appoquinimink River in New Castle County, Delaware.  Drawyer Creek is a mostly tidal tributary to the Appoquinimink River and is non-tidal above Shallcross Lake. Old Drawyers Church, a historic church, is located to the south of the creek.

See also
List of Delaware rivers

References

Rivers of Delaware
Rivers of New Castle County, Delaware
Tributaries of Delaware Bay